Room Alone 401-410 (Room Alone 401-410 – ) is a 2014 Thai television series directed by Nuttapong Mongkolsawas and produced by GMMTV.

The series concluded on 27 December 2014.

Its sequel, Room Alone 2, premiered on 4 October 2015.

Cast and characters

Main 
 Anchasa Mongkhonsamai as Jaegun
 Achirawich Saliwattana (Gun) as Earng
 Maripha Siripool (Wawa) as Baitoey
 Phakjira Kanrattanasood (Nanan) as Min
 Natthawat Chainarongsophon (Gun) as Camp
 Suwittayawat Pariyawit as Men
 Jirakit Kuariyakul (Toptap) as Tul
 Chatchawit Techarukpong (Victor) as Terk
 Jirakit Thawornwong (Mek) as View
 Worranit Thawornwong (Mook) as Snow
 Jumpol Adulkittiporn (Off) as Puen

Supporting 
 Puwadon Vejvongsa as Kin
 Watchara Sukchum (Jennie) as Neon
 Sattaphong Phiangphor (Tao) as Tent
 Korawit Boonsri (Gun) as Ter, Gang's boyfriend
 Phurikulkrit Chusakdiskulwibul (Amp) as Gang
 Nisachon Siothaisong as Zen so Sad
 Thitipoom Techaapaikhun (New) as Ray
 Tawan Vihokratana (Tay) as Warm
 Phanuphong Wongthom as Cable
 Thassapak Hsu (Bie) as Tawan
 Weluree Ditsayabut (Fai) as Cake, Tent's girlfriend

Guest role 
 Patcha Poonpiriya (June) as Air (Ep. 10)

References

External links 
 GMMTV

Television series by GMMTV
Thai romance television series
Thai drama television series
2014 Thai television series debuts
2014 Thai television series endings
One 31 original programming